Ambai may refer to:
 Ambai Islands, an island group in Cenderawaish Bay, Indonesia
 Ambai language, an Austronesian language spoken on the Ambai Islands
 Ambasamudram, or Ambai, a town in India
 C. S. Lakshmi (born 1944), pseudonym Ambai, Indian feminist writer